The Velvet Paw is a 1916 American silent drama film directed by Maurice Tourneur and starring House Peters, Gail Kane and Ned Burton. The film offers a critical view of rampant corruption in American politics.

The film's sets were designed by the French-born art director Ben Carré.

Cast
 House Peters as Robert Moorehead  
 Gail Kane as Mary Dexter  
 Ned Burton as Sen. Barring  
 Frank Goldsmith as Congressman Drake  
 Charles Mackay as Undetermined role  
 Charles Edwards as Undetermined role  
 Alex Shannon as Undetermined role

References

Bibliography
 Waldman, Harry. Maurice Tourneur: The Life and Films. McFarland, 2001.

External links

1916 films
1916 drama films
Silent American drama films
Films directed by Maurice Tourneur
American silent feature films
1910s English-language films
Films set in Washington, D.C.
American black-and-white films
World Film Company films
1910s American films